Stora Trutskär (or simply Trutskär) is an island in the northwest of the Swedish sector of the Bay of Bothnia, in the Kalix archipelago. It has a beach area used for recreation, but is mostly covered by a nature reserve.

Location

In the northwest of the island there is a sandy beach and large sand dunes.
Stora Trutskär holds the clubhouse for the Kalix Sail and Motorboat Club (Kalix Segel och Motorbåtssällskap).
Facilities include a hosted cabin, playhouse and playground for children, outdoor grills and barbecue house.

Nature reserve

Since 1997  of the island have been set aside as a nature reserve.
The reserve covers the entire island apart from the beach area in the northwest, as well as two reefs to the east of the island.
The forest has not been used for forestry, but people have extracted wood for home consumption. 
The best woods are found in the center of the southern part of the island.
A large storm in 1982 threw down a lot of trees on the east side, and they have been replaced by brushwood.
There is a swath of limestone bedrock near the reserve. The lime from this rock gives calcareous soils that support a rich flora.
Visitors may camp and make a fire if they bring firewood, but not directly on the rocks. 
They may hike, pick berries and mushrooms and fish, but must not harm the flora and fauna.

References

Sources

Swedish islands in the Baltic
Islands of Norrbotten County
Kalix